Warwolf is the name of different fictional characters appearing in American comic books published by Marvel Comics.

Publication history
The Cybertek version of Warwolf first appeared in Deathlok (vol. 2) #1 and was created by Dwayne McDuffie, Gregory Wright, Denys Cowan, and Mike Manley.

The Vince Marcus version of Warwolf first appeared in Nick Fury’s Howling Commandos #1 and was created by Richard Buckler.

The Martin Reyna version of Warwolf first appeared in S.H.I.E.L.D. (vol. 3) #9 and was created by Al Ewing and Stefano Caselli.

Fictional character biography

Cybertek version
Warwolf was created by Billy Hansen and others at Cybertek Systems Inc. (a cybernetic research division of Roxxon Energy Corporation) as a hunter assassination cyborg which occurred before the creation of Deathlok. Billy Hansen and his colleagues placed a gray wolf brain into the cyborg body. From his imprisonment, Harlan Ryker remotely activated it and sent it to attack all his former superiors who might testify against him for the creation of Deathlok. Billy Hansen was the first person Warwolf attacked and killed him upon shattering his car. Then it broke into the National Security Agency facility where it destroyed all records that were pertaining to Harlan Ryker's investigation. Upon traveling to Cybertek's main facility in Paterson, New Jersey where Deathlok was meeting with Jim Dworman, Deathlok discovered that Warwolf had the brain of a gray wolf and made certain that its systems were on non-lethal mode. After Deathlok was unable to stop Warwolf from destroying the computerized files, Warwolf escaped where it moved faster than Deathlok. When Deathlok infiltrated the Danbury Maximum Security Federal Penitentiary to confront Harlan Ryker, Warwolf also showed up and targeted Cybertek's account manager John Rozum. Deathlok managed to prevent Warwolf from attacking John Rozum. Deathlok used his energy pistol to incapacitate Warwolf. Deathlok rescinded the "no killing" parameter and put Warwolf out of its misery since it was undergoing a system failure and that its organic components would fail in 6 hours. There was enough back-up memory that Dworman was able to call up Harlan Ryker's kill orders.

Vince Marcus
Vince Marcus is a member of S.H.I.E.L.D.'s Howling Commandos Monster Force. He is the field commander. It is unknown yet when he joined S.H.I.E.L.D. or why he is nicknamed Warwolf.

He has fought with guns and also used his claws to infiltrate the "Lords of Lightning", a doomsday cult and led the assault on Stonehedge when Merlin and faeries were bringing their world into ours.

Martin Reyna
Martin Reyna is a S.H.I.E.L.D. Agent that is in charge of Area 13's S.T.A.K.E. (short for Special Threat Assessment for Known Extranormalities), a division that is in charge of dealing with supernatural events. Martin was also working with Dr. Paul Kraye on secret projects which he feared the returned Life Model Decoy of Dum Dum Dugan would discover sooner or later for which both decided they had to get rid of Dum Dum Dugan before he discovered them.

As part of the All-New, All-Different Marvel event, Martin Reyna was made the supervisor of the latest Howling Commandos which is led by Dum Dum Dugan.

Warwolf was with the Howling Commandos at the time when they helped Old Man Logan rescue Jubilee from Dracula.

Powers and abilities
The Cybertek version of Warwolf has super-strength, enhanced durability, and could run at 317 mph, enough to shatter a car. It had eye socket-mounted plasma projectors that release highly destructive beams with the side effects leaving Warwolf blind when in use and can overload if overused.

Vince Marcus in werewolf form has superhuman strength, good reaction time, enhanced durability and endurance, speed, and heightened senses. Outside of the use of his claws and fangs, Warwolf wields a dagger and an energy pistol. Unlike other lycanthropes, Warwolf is affected by Mars instead of by the Moon.

Martin Reyna has a Warwolf Gene Package embedded on his right mechanical arm which he can use to mutate into a werewolf.

Other versions

Earth-7484
War-Wolf was a cyborg created for Simon Ryker, presumably under Project: Alpha-Mech. Ryker considered him his first success, as Deathlok's rebellious nature rendered him a failure for Ryker's needs. War-Wolf's original human body is unidentified.

Deathlok tracked reports of his old comrade Mike Travers to the Statue of Liberty. There he fought his way past Simon Ryker's agents and into a cell, which contained Ryker and the War-Wolf, whom Ryker claimed to by Travers.

Ryker sent War-Wolf to kill Deathlok, who found himself unable to fight back against what he believed to be his best friend. Allegedly programmed with Travers' knowledge on Manning, War-Wolf punched Deathlok to the ground, but Deathlok forced him to fire back with his laser pistol, blasting War-Wolf's pistol from his hand. Deathlok was unable to make himself follow up on the attack, and War-Wolf then smashed him with a piece of machinery and then battered him repeatedly, eventually even tearing out his life-line. War-Wolf continued to pummel the rapidly weakening Deathlok, but then Ryker became overconfident and revealed that War-Wolf was not Travers (he further claimed Travers had died on the operating table, though Travers was later shown to be alive). This had the opposite effect of what Ryker intended, and Deathlok was newly inspired to fight back against War-Wolf. Deathlok tackled War-Wolf off the top of the Statue of Liberty's pedestal and made sure that War-Wolf took the impact fully on his back. Though his computer stated that his opponent's main circuits were near to a dead halt, Deathlok refused to stop. He continued to beat on War-Wolf, knocking his dagger from his hand and then blasting a hole through his chest with his laser pistol. His computer analyzed the cyborg opponent as demolished.

In other media
 The Martin Reyna incarnation of Warwolf, known as Werewolf, appears in Hulk: Where Monsters Dwell, voiced by Edward Bosco. This version is a member of the Howling Commandos.
 The Vince Marcus incarnation of Warwolf appears as a playable character in Marvel: Future Fight.

References

External links
 Warwolf (Vic Marcus) at Marvel Wiki
 Warwolf (Michael Travers) at Marvel Wiki
 Warwolf at Comic Vine
 Warwolf of Earth-7484 at Marvel Appendix
 Cybertek Warwolf at Marvel Appendix

Marvel Comics cyborgs
Fictional characters with superhuman durability or invulnerability
Fictional characters with superhuman senses
Fictional werewolves
Marvel Comics characters
Marvel Comics characters who can move at superhuman speeds
Marvel Comics characters with superhuman strength
S.H.I.E.L.D. agents
Howling Commandos